Tata Starbucks Private Limited, formerly known as Tata Starbucks Limited, is a 50:50 joint venture company, owned by Tata Consumer Products and Starbucks Corporation, that owns and operates Starbucks outlets in India. The outlets are branded Starbucks "A Tata Alliance".

History

In January 2011, Starbucks Corporation and Tata Coffee announced plans to begin opening Starbucks locations in India. Despite a false start in 2007, in January 2012 Starbucks finally announced a 50:50 joint venture with Tata Global Beverages, called Tata Starbucks Ltd., which would own and operate outlets branded "Starbucks, A Tata Alliance". Starbucks had previously attempted to enter the Indian market in 2007. Starbucks did not cite any reason for the withdrawal.

On 19 October 2012, Starbucks opened its first store in India, measuring 4,500 sq ft in Elphinstone Building, Horniman Circle, Mumbai. Starbucks opened its first roasting and packaging plant to supply its Indian outlets in Kodagu, Karnataka in 2013.

Starbucks expanded its presence to Delhi on 24 January 2013 by opening 2 outlets at Terminal III of the Indira Gandhi International Airport, and later one in Connaught Place. However, the company would open its 50th store in India only on 8 July 2014 in chennai.

The third city of India to get a Starbucks outlet was Pune, where the company opened an outlet at Koregaon Park, on 8 September 2013. Starbucks opened a 3,000-square-foot flagship store at Koramangala, Bangalore on 22 November 2013, making it the fourth city to have an outlet.

Starbucks opened the largest coffee-forward store in the country at Vittal Mallya Road, Bangalore on 18 March 2019. The store measures 3,000 sq ft, and is Starbucks' 140th outlet in India. Tata Starbucks opened 25 stores in 2017–18 and 30 in the 2018–19 fiscal year. On 21 February 2019, CEO Navin Gurnaney announced that Tata Starbucks would transition to using only compostable and recyclable packaging materials across all its stores from June 2020.

Starbucks announced its entry into the Gujarat market on 7 August 2019. The company simultaneously opened five stores in Surat and Ahmedabad the next day. Starbucks' flagship store in the state is located at Prahlad Nagar, Ahmedabad and offers more vegetarian options than other Indian outlets. CEO Navin Gurnaney stated that the company would open more than 30 stores in the 2019–20 fiscal year, of which 11 had already opened. The company opened its 170th outlet and the first in Vadodara in December 2019. The first drive-through Starbucks outlet in India was opened at Zirakpur, Punjab on 13 July 2020. The company opened its 200th store at Amritsar, Punjab on 22 October 2020. Starbucks entered into Madhya Pradesh in February 2021 by opening 3 stores in Indore and Bhopal with further expansion plans in Indore. Starbucks entered Rajasthan by opening 2 stores in Jaipur in August 2021.

On 10 February 2021, the company announced that Navin Gurnaney was stepping down as CEO. Sushant Dash, who is currently President, Packaged beverages at Tata Consumer Products, replaced him as CEO effective 1 May 2021. Tata Starbucks opened 40 new stores in 2020–21, including expanding to 7 new cities, and the company opened 50 new stores in 2021–22, including expanding to 8 new cities.

Products

Apart from the usual products offered internationally, Starbucks in India has some Indian-style product offerings such as Tandoori Paneer Roll, Chocolate Rossomalai Mousse, Malai Chom Chom Tiramisu, Elaichi Mewa Croissant, Chicken Kathi Roll and Murg Tikka Panini to suit Indian customers. All espressos sold in Indian outlets are made from Indian roasted coffee beans supplied by Tata Coffee. Starbucks also sells Himalayan bottled mineral water. Free Wi-Fi is available at all Starbucks stores.

In January 2017, Tata Starbucks introduced Starbucks' tea brand Teavana offering 18 different varieties of tea across its outlets in India. One of the varieties, called the India Spice Majesty Blend, was specifically developed for the Indian market and is only available in India. India Spice Majesty Blend is a blend of full leaf Assam black tea infused with whole cinnamon, cardamom, cloves, pepper, star anise and ginger.

On 15 June 2015, Tata Starbucks announced that it was suspending the use of ingredients that had not been approved by the Food Safety and Standards Authority of India (FSSAI). The company did not specify what the ingredients were or which products they were used. The company also stated that it was in the process of applying for FSSAI approval for these ingredients.

Tata Starbucks launched the Starbucks Delivers program in early 2019. The service offers home delivery from Starbucks outlets through a partnership with Swiggy. The service was first launched in Mumbai, with plans to roll it out to other cities.

Locations
As of January 2022, Starbucks operates 271 outlets in 55 cities of India.

Legal issues
The US-based Starbucks Corporation filed a lawsuit in the Delhi High Court in July 2018 against Delhi-based coffee chain SardarBuksh for allegedly copying their name and logo. The owner of SardarBuksh agreed to change its name on 28 September 2018. Sanmeet Singh Kalra, co-founder of SardarBuksh, said, "Our name rhymed with Starbucks which is why the court has ruled in their favour." Kalra also stated that his company would not change its logo. Its logo features a circle of green and black with a figure at the centre, similar to the Starbucks logo, except with a man in a turban instead of a mermaid.

In March 2019, an investigation by the Directorate General of Anti Profiteering (DGAP) found Tata Starbucks guilty of profiteering  by not reducing the goods and services tax (GST) charged on coffee. The GST Council had reduced the tax rate on restaurants from 18% to 5% from 17 November 2017. However, the DGAP found that Tata Starbucks had raised the base price of one coffee variant such that its retail price remained the same even after the tax rate was reduced. The case was pending before the National Anti-Profiteering Authority (NAA), which will issue the final verdict. In November 2020, the NAA upheld the findings of the DGAP's investigation, fined Tata Starbucks an amount of  plus 18% interest, and ordered the company to "reduce the prices of products so that the benefits of tax reduction is passed on to the recipients".

International presence
The Tata Group and Starbucks Corporation also collaborate on some ventures outside India. Starbucks Reserve Tata Nullore Estates, the first-ever Starbucks Reserve coffee sourced exclusively from India, became the first Indian coffee to be roasted and sold at Starbucks home city of Seattle in 2016. The coffee was later rolled out across Starbucks outlets in the United States. In the same year, Starbucks began selling Himalayan bottled mineral water at its outlets in Singapore and also began retailing its products on board all flights of Vistara, a joint venture between the Tata Group and Singapore Airlines.

See also 

 Café Coffee Day

References 
         59.Starbucks opens outlet in raipur, chhattisgarh

External links

 
Coffee brands
Multinational food companies
Indian companies established in 2012
Restaurants established in 2012
Tata Group subsidiaries
Multinational joint-venture companies
Coffeehouses and cafés in India
Food and drink companies based in Mumbai
Privately held companies of India